Cornhill is a small village close to Banff, Aberdeenshire, Scotland. The village was originally a burgh of a feudal barony and is now a farming community.

There is the local garage Ewens of Cornhill, Post Office and the local pub Peggy Duff's (formerly the Gordon Arms). There is a nearby castle, Castle of Park, also known as Park House, which was built around 1536. There is a local Church of Scotland which is a joint church between Ordiquhill and Cornhill. Ordiquhill's own church, in Overtoun, was built around 1805. As of 1990, it was "awaiting beneficial re-use".

Cornhill has its own highland games in summer, including the Knock Hill race, an  race up the nearby Knock Hill and back.

The United Free Church was built in 1904, and the Hay Memorial Hall in 1893. Culvie House, a large three-bay house, dates to around 1730.

Prehistory
There is considerable evidence of prehistoric habitation in the vicinity of Cornhill, including the extant Longman Hill barrow.

Notable people
 J. Henry created the Kerr's Pink variety of potato in 1907.
 G. Morrison bred the world's most expensive sheep Deveronvale Perfection which sold for £231,000 in 2009.

References

External links

 Cornhill Highland Games

Villages in Aberdeenshire